Koas Krala is a khum (commune) of Koas Krala District in Battambang Province in north-western Cambodia.

It is the seat of Koas Krala District.

Villages

 Spean
 Voat
 Koas Krala
 Tuol Balangk
 Toul Ta Muem
 Thmei
 Prey Popel
 Beong Chhneah
 Damnak Kakaoh

References

Communes of Battambang province
Koas Krala District